Anna Alliquander (born 23 May 1977) is a Hungarian rower. She competed in the women's lightweight double sculls event at the 2000 Summer Olympics.

References

External links
 

1977 births
Living people
Hungarian female rowers
Olympic rowers of Hungary
Rowers at the 2000 Summer Olympics
Rowers from Budapest